Kerch Airport  is an airport in Kerch, . The airport is located 1.5 km northwest of the city (sometimes it is confused with Baherove Air Base located nearby). The airport is currently bankrupt, and was put on sale for 27M Hryvn (3.3M USD) by the city authorities.

Though the airport is bankrupt, it is still in service, and is used by general aviation today. The airport itself is not in good condition. The runway needs repair, airport facilities are bad, there is a working ATC tower which is also needs improvements. There are no airline services to this airport.

Airline flights to/from airport ceased operations approximately in 2008. There were approximately 8-10 flights per day, both Domestic and International. In 2005–2006, the airport tried to resume flights to Kyiv and Moscow using Motor Sich Airlines, but expenses were high and profit was too low, which made flying unprofitable.

Accidents and incidents

On 13 November 1971, an Aeroflot Antonov 24B (CCCP-46378) struck a cable and crashed on approach. There were total of 5 passengers and crew aboard who all died on impact. The aircraft was written off (damaged beyond repair).

References

Airports in Crimea
Airports built in the Soviet Union
Buildings and structures in Kerch
Enterprises of Kerch